The Ministry of Sport (MoS), formerly the General Sports Authority (GSA), is a government ministry responsible for sports in Saudi Arabia. The Ministry of Sport was previously known as the General Sports Authority and before that as the General Presidency of Youth Welfare (GPYW), which was created in 1974.

History
The General Presidency of Youth Welfare (GPYW) was established in 1974 by royal decree by the late King Faisal Bin Abdul-Aziz. In July 1987, the GPYW launched the Leadership Institute campus, the main Saudi entity accredited with training the youth to become expert trainers in sport.

The GPYW became known as the General Sports Authority in May 2016, following a royal decree restructuring the entity and placing Prince Abdullah bin Musaad Al Saud as its chairman.

Mohammed Al-Sheikh was appointed to the position of chairman of GSA in April 2017, replacing Prince Abdullah bin Musaad Al Saud. On September 6, Mohammed Al-Sheikh was replaced by Turki bin Abdel Muhsin Al-Asheikh at this position.

Community Sports
The Ministry of Sport’ remit of improving and developing the sports environment in the Kingdom of Saudi Arabia includes a focus on encouraging sports and physical activity at the grassroots level. Towards that end, the Saudi Sports for All Federation (SFA) was created in 2018 as a dedicated body to drive community sports. In 2019, it was given the official mandate to lead community sports initiatives supporting the Saudi Vision 2030’s goals. The Quality of Life program calls for increasing the number of people undertaking regular physical activity in the Kingdom to 40% by 2030. Under the Ministry of Sport umbrella, the SFA is helping the Kingdom meet this target by creating sporting opportunities, encouraging lifestyle changes, and initiating campaigns and challenges encouraging physical activity. The SFA runs year-round initiatives, including community activities, sports challenges, virtual walking and running challenges, tournaments, and activations of public spaces to host sports-related activities.

The SFA App, launched in 2020 for iOS and Android devices, serves as the central hub for these initiatives. The App also hosts the SFA Rewards program, where users are incentivized to stay active by earning points that can be redeemed against gifts or charitable donations. 

The SFA collaborates closely with public and private sector entities such as the Saudi Arabian Olympic Committee (SAOC), Ministry of Sport, Ministry of Municipal and Rural Affairs and the Saudi Data and AI Authority (SDAIA) to further its goal of a healthier, more active Saudi Arabia.

Football
In 2014, the Ministry of Sport unveiled a new stadium, King Abdullah Sports City (KASC), which hosted the final of the 2014 King Cup. After the appointment of Turki Al-Asheikh as chairman in 2017, a committee was formed to find local talent in Saudi Arabian youth, and develop them into professional footballers. 70 young persons were admitted in the first edition of the program. Some tournaments and award systems were also restructured: The Crown Prince Cup was renamed the Super Cup, and the First Class Tournament became the Prince Faisal bin Fahd Tournament. The reward of the Custodian of the Two Holy Mosques Cup was raised from SAR 5.5 million to SAR 10 million.

Saudi Arabia is all set to host Supercopa de Espana for the first time and stage another huge sporting event in the kingdom with top teams like Barcelona F.C., Valencia F.C., and Real Madrid participating. However, the number of foreign supporters flying to Saudi Arabia for attending the match is fewer than 200, paying upwards of £2,000. According to AS, less than even 40 Madrid fans have chosen to fly to the semi-final. Out of all the tickets put up for sale, under 10% have only been sold while most are not sold at all yet.

Women in sports
On August 1, 2016, Princess Reema bint Bandar Al Saud became the vice-president of Women’s Affairs at the Ministry of Sport.

In July 2017, the Saudi government announced physical education classes would be made available to girls in public state schools.

WWE

Greatest Royal Rumble
On March 5, 2018, WWE and the Saudi General Sports Authority advertised the Greatest Royal Rumble to be held on 27 April at the King Abdullah Sports City in Jeddah.

The event showcased a 50-men Royal Rumble match rather than the traditional 30-men for the first time in the history of WWE. Braun Strowman, who was the 41st entrant in the match, won by lastly eliminating Big Cass. Strowman later received the WWE Greatest Royal Rumble Trophy and a new Belt Kingdom Championship from Chairman of the Saudi General Sports Authority, Turki bin Abdel Muhsin Al-Asheikh and WWE Chairman Vince McMahon.

This event marked the beginning of a ten-year strategic multi-platform partnership with WWE and the Saudi General Sports Authority.

Description
The Ministry of Sport represents Saudi Arabian sport at an international level and manages the Saudi Arabian Olympic Committee as well as all thirty Saudi sports federations. Locally, it defines all sporting objectives. Current work by the Ministry of Sport covers five areas:
Increasing the society’s level of participation in sports and physical activity
Creating a competitive sports industry
Developing the quality of local sports facilities
Improving financial sustainability of the sports sector
Achieving more transparency in its institutional performance and culture

Most sports facilities in Saudi Arabia are owned and managed by the Ministry of Sport. This includes twenty-four sports cities and stadiums such as the King Fahd International Stadium as well as indoor halls and swimming pools. Twenty-two youth hostels with sports facilities are operated by the Ministry of Sport across Saudi Arabia as well as two permanent youth camps in Ta'if and Ha'il.

Governance
The following are past chairmen of the General Sports Authority:
Khalid bin Faisal Al Saud
Faisal bin Fahd
Sultan bin Fahd Al Saud
Abdullah bin Musa'ad bin Abdulaziz Al Saud Asst. Dr. Mansour Bin Abdullah AlMansour
Mohammad bin Abdulmalik Al-Asheikh
Turki Abdulmohsen Al-Asheikh

See also

Sport in Saudi Arabia
Saudi Crown Prince Cup

References

External links
Official website

1974 establishments in Saudi Arabia
Government ministries of Saudi Arabia
Sport in Saudi Arabia
Sports governing bodies in Saudi Arabia
Sports organizations established in 1974